Mohammadabad-e Anbari (also Romanized as Moḩammadābād-e ʿAnbarī; also known as Moḩammadābād and Moḩammadābād-e Pā’īn) is a village in Ganjabad Rural District, Esmaili District, Anbarabad County, Kerman Province, Iran. At the 2006 census, its population was 63, in 11 families.

References 

Populated places in Anbarabad County